Procaine blockade is a medical treatment, where procaine solution affects the peripheral nervous system. Procaine blockade was developed by Aleksandr Vasilyevich Vishnevsky in 1929. There are lumbar, jugular, sacral, extremity and short neural blockades used.

References
Great Soviet Encyclopedia, 3rd ed., vol. 3

Medical treatments